Wals may refer to:
Wals, Gelderland, a settlement in Netherlands
Wals-Siezenheim, a suburb of Salzburg, Austria
A common misspelling of Vals

WALS may refer to:
The World Atlas of Language Structures, a map software for linguistic typology
 WALS, an American radio station